Gabriela de la Caridad Azcuy Labrador (18 March 1861 – 15 March 1914) was a Cuban nurse and poet who participated in the Cuban War of Independence. On 10 February 1896, she joined the militia of Miguel Lores near Gramales as an army medic. The following year, General Lorente wrote that "in the heat of battle at Las Cañas, between Guane and Mantua, Mrs. Azcuy got off of her horse to heal the wounded in such moments of peril that other doctors had already temporarily withdrawn." Azcuy was made a Captain and after the war entered politics as the Secretary of the Board of Education in Viñales.

Biography
On 18 March 1861, Adela Azcuy was born in Viñales, Cuba to parents Francisco Azcuy Martínez and María del Carmen Labrador Piloto and would live on a farm in San Cayetano until 1865. Her family moved to the residence of Azcuy's grandmother, where she learned horsemanship, hunting, and the handling of firearms. Azcuy had her first marriage to Creole Jorge Monzón Cosculluela, a Bachelor in Pharmacy in 1886. Their marriage was happy until 1891 when, while working to treat the victims of an outbreak of smallpox, Monzón died of the disease on 17 January. She remarried to Spaniard Castor del Moral, an employee of the pharmaceutical her late husband worked at, but their marriage broke down over disagreements of the political future of Cuba.

On 10 February 1896, Azcuy joined a guerrilla militia commanded by Lieutenant Colonel Miguel Lores near Gramales, in spite of her gender, because of her fierce spirit and pharmaceutical knowledge, earned from working as her husband's right hand in the making of medicine and treating of wounds. During one battle, a General Lorente wrote of her:

Citations

References

 

1861 births
1914 deaths
Cuban nurses
Cuban women poets
People from Pinar del Río Province
Female wartime nurses
Women in 19th-century warfare
Women in war in the Caribbean